Jivadaman was a Saka ruler of the Western Kshatrapas in northwestern India from during the 2nd century CE. He was the son of Damajadasri I (170–175), and the brother of Satyadaman.

Biography 
The exact dating of Jivadaman's reign has been debated. He may have ruled as late as 121 (199 CE).

Jivadaman had no sons, and consequently he was succeeded by his cousin Rudrasena I.

Coins of Jivadaman 
With Jivadaman, Western Satrap coins started to be minted with a date, recorded in Brahmi numerals behind the king's head. According to his coins, Jivadaman seems to have ruled two times, once between Saka Era 100 and 103 (178–181 CE), before the rule of Rudrasimha I, and once between Saka Era 119 and 120 (197–198 CE).

Notes

References 
British Museum
Rapson, Edward James A catalogue of the Indian coins in the British Museum. Catalogue of the coins of the Andhra dynasty, the Western Ksatrapas, the Traikutaka dynasty, and the Bodhi dynasty Eastern Book House, India, 1990. First published in 1908.

Western Satraps
2nd-century Indian monarchs